ClearCube is a computer systems manufacturer based in Austin, Texas, owned by parent company ClearCube Holdings. The company became known for its blade PC products;  it has since expanded its offerings to include desktop virtualization and VDI. It was founded in 1997 by Andrew Heller (former IBM Fellow) and Barry Thornton as Vicinity Systems.

In 2005, ClearCube derived about a third of its revenue from virtual infrastructure products sold into the financial services sector, with the majority of the rest of the revenue coming from customers in the health-care and government sectors. Since 2005, ClearCube has continued to focus on virtualization-capable hardware and management software, which has led to strong revenue growth. In 2011, the company announced 50% year-over-year revenue growth due to the strong performance of its virtual desktop products.

In 2011, ClearCube acquired Dallas-based Network Elites. The acquisition brought roughly 25 additional employees to the company and expanded ClearCube's Cloud services capabilities.

Partnerships 
Until 2005, IBM was a reseller of the entire product line of ClearCube. Afterwards, IBM bundled some of its own hardware with ClearCube's software, and also diversified its software offering to include Citrix and VMware products. When IBM sold its PC division to Lenovo, the latter also began reselling ClearCube blades. Other major PC manufactures, like HP, also began to compete in the blade PC niche around this time. Other resellers of ClearCube products included Hitachi and SAIC.

In 2008, ClearCube spun off its software division as VDIworks, and while VDIworks has developed additional OEM relationships, the two companies remain closely associated in OEM partnership, and share the same investors and owners. In January 2008, ClearCube also introduced products implementing Teradici's PC-over-IP protocol, including two dual DVI thin clients, the I9420 I/Port and C7420 C/Port, which connect to the blades using copper-based and fiber-optic Ethernet, respectively.

References

Further reading 
 Michael Kanellos (September 20, 2002) Start-up brings 'blades' to the desktop, CNET News
 Shelley Solheim (June 8, 2006) ClearCube readies new PC blade tools, InfoWorld
 Oliver Rist, February 4, 2005 ClearCube makes good blade system even better, InfoWorld

Computer hardware companies
Centralized computing
Thin clients